PSDC may refer to:

 Christian Social Democratic Party, former name of Christian Democracy (Brazil) (DC)
 Process Systems Design and Control Laboratory
 Philippine Schools Debate Championship

ja:DWC